The 2016 UEFA European Under-19 Championship qualification was a men's under-19 football competition organised by UEFA to determine the seven national teams joining the automatically qualified hosts Germany in the 2016 UEFA European Under-19 Championship final tournament. 

A total of 53 national teams entered this qualifying competition, which was played in two rounds between September 2015 and March 2016. Players born on or after 1 January 1997 were eligible to participate.

Format
The qualifying competition consisted of two rounds:
Qualifying round: Apart from Spain, which received a bye to the elite round as the team with the highest seeding coefficient, the remaining 52 teams were drawn into 13 groups of four teams. Each group was played in single round-robin format at one of the teams selected as hosts after the draw. The 13 group winners, the 13 runners-up, and the third-placed team with the best record against the first- and second-placed teams in its group advanced to the elite round.
Elite round: The 28 teams were drawn into seven groups of four teams. Each group was played in single round-robin format at one of the teams selected as hosts after the draw. The seven group winners qualified for the final tournament.

Tiebreakers
The teams were ranked according to points (3 points for a win, 1 point for a draw, 0 points for a loss). If two or more teams were equal on points on completion of a mini-tournament, the following tie-breaking criteria were applied, in the order given, to determine the rankings:
Higher number of points obtained in the mini-tournament matches played among the teams in question;
Superior goal difference resulting from the mini-tournament matches played among the teams in question;
Higher number of goals scored in the mini-tournament matches played among the teams in question;
If, after having applied criteria 1 to 3, teams still had an equal ranking, criteria 1 to 3 were reapplied exclusively to the mini-tournament matches between the teams in question to determine their final rankings. If this procedure did not lead to a decision, criteria 5 to 9 applied;
Superior goal difference in all mini-tournament matches;
Higher number of goals scored in all mini-tournament matches;
If only two teams had the same number of points, and they were tied according to criteria 1 to 6 after having met in the last round of the mini-tournament, their rankings were determined by a penalty shoot-out (not used if more than two teams had the same number of points, or if their rankings were not relevant for qualification for the next stage).
Lower disciplinary points total based only on yellow and red cards received in the mini-tournament matches (red card = 3 points, yellow card = 1 point, expulsion for two yellow cards in one match = 3 points);
Drawing of lots.

To determine the best third-placed team from the qualifying round, the results against the teams in fourth place were discarded. The following criteria were applied:
Higher number of points;
Superior goal difference;
Higher number of goals scored;
Lower disciplinary points total based only on yellow and red cards received (red card = 3 points, yellow card = 1 point, expulsion for two yellow cards in one match = 3 points);
Drawing of lots.

Qualifying round

Draw
The draw for the qualifying round was held on 3 December 2014, 09:50 CET (UTC+1), at the UEFA headquarters in Nyon, Switzerland.

The teams were seeded according to their coefficient ranking, calculated based on the following:
2012 UEFA European Under-19 Championship final tournament and qualifying competition (qualifying round and elite round)
2013 UEFA European Under-19 Championship final tournament and qualifying competition (qualifying round and elite round)
2014 UEFA European Under-19 Championship final tournament and qualifying competition (qualifying round and elite round)

Each group contained two teams from Pot A and two teams from Pot B. For political reasons, Armenia and Azerbaijan (due to the disputed status of Nagorno-Karabakh), as well as Russia and Ukraine (due to the Russian military intervention in Ukraine), could not be drawn in the same group.

Notes
Germany (Coeff: 8.833) qualified automatically for the final tournament as hosts.

Groups
Times up to 24 October 2015 were CEST (UTC+2), thereafter times were CET (UTC+1).

Group 1

Group 2

Group 3

Group 4

Group 5

Group 6

Group 7

Group 8

The match was completed with a 2–1 scoreline before a 3–0 default victory was awarded to Austria due to Albania fielding an ineligible player.

The match was completed with a 0–1 scoreline before a 0–3 default victory was awarded to Georgia due to Albania fielding an ineligible player.

Group 9

Matches on the first matchday, originally to be played on 11 November (Norway v Northern Ireland at 12:00 and Russia v Slovakia at 15:00), were postponed to 12 November due to heavy rain in Sochi. Matches on the second matchday were also pushed back from 13 November to 14 November as a result.

Group 10

Group 11

Group 12

Group 13

Ranking of third-placed teams
To determine the best third-placed team from the qualifying round advancing to the elite round, only the results of the third-placed teams against the first and second-placed teams in their group were taken into account.

Elite round

Draw
The draw for the elite round was held on 3 December 2015, 11:00 CET (UTC+1), at the UEFA headquarters in Nyon, Switzerland.

The teams were seeded according to their results in the qualifying round. Spain, which received a bye to the elite round, were automatically seeded into Pot A. Each group contained one team from Pot A, one team from Pot B, one team from Pot C, and one team from Pot D. Teams from the same qualifying round group could not be drawn in the same group. For political reasons, Russia and Ukraine (due to the Russian military intervention in Ukraine) could not be drawn in the same group.

Groups
Times up to 26 March 2016 were CET (UTC+1), thereafter times were CEST (UTC+2).

Group 1

Group 2

Group 3

Group 4

Group 5

Group 6

Group 7

Qualified teams
The following eight teams qualified for the final tournament:

1 Bold indicates champion for that year. Italic indicates host for that year.

Top goalscorers
The following players scored four goals or more in the qualifying competition:

6 goals

 Ivan Šaponjić

5 goals

 Nany Dimata
 Jean-Kévin Augustin
 Anas Mahamid
 Karol Świderski
 Luka Jović

4 goals

 Dominik Prokop
 Aleksandar Georgiev
 Ondřej Mihálik
 Mikkel Duelund
 Kristian Veber
 Luca Vido
 Edvin Muratovic
 Sam Lammers
 Aurélio Buta

References

External links

Qualification
2016